Douglas Yates Yongue Sr. (born March 20, 1937) is a former Democratic member of the North Carolina General Assembly representing the state's forty-sixth House district, including constituents in Hoke, Robeson and Scotland counties. A retired educator from Laurinburg, North Carolina, Yongue served for 8 terms before being defeated by Gaston (G. L.) Pridgen when running for his 9th term.

Yongue previously served on the following General Assembly committees: Appropriations (Chairman); Education (Member); Education Subcommittee on Education (Member); Ethics (Vice-Chairman); Federal Relations and Indian Affairs (Member); Rules, Calendar and Operations of the House (Member); State Personnel (Member).

Recent electoral history

2010

2008

2006

2004

2002

2000

References

|-

1937 births
Living people
People from Lumberton, North Carolina
People from Laurinburg, North Carolina
20th-century American politicians
21st-century American politicians
Democratic Party members of the North Carolina House of Representatives